Prayanam ( The voyage) is a 1975 Indian Malayalam-language feature film written by Padmarajan and directed by Bharathan. It was the debut of both Padmarajan and Bharathan. The writer-director duo is often credited for revolutionising Malayalam cinema with their expressive and innovative works.

Prayanam stars Mohan Sharma, Kottarakkara Sreedharan Nair, Master Raghu, Lakshmi, Kaviyoor Ponnamma and Nanditha Bose. It probes into the realities that existed within the Brahmin community of the day. Kottarakkara Sreedharan Nair plays an elderly Brahmin priest married to a girl young enough to be his daughter.

Bharathan produced the film as well as did the art direction. Music is composed by M. B. Sreenivasan with lyrics by Vayalar, Yatheendra Das and Bichu Thirumala. Bharathan remade the film into Tamil as Savithiri in 1980, but could not repeat the success.

Plot
Savithrikkutty, eldest daughter of an aged poor Nambuthiri Brahmin is married off to an aged widower (a priest) of the same caste. The new family where she is received comprises two other members, Appu (the man's son who is just a boy) and Amminiyamma. Amminiyamma's son is working in a distant place. Until Savithri's arrival she was the sole helper of the widower. The age disparity between the man and Savithri causes their sexual life to be without colors. The man soon engages himself in temple matters and the woman, finding no better way to kill her time plays with the man's kid and does her chores without charm. One day a young man named Aravindan comes to his ancestral house in the village. On his way he meets aged people who stare at him as if they never have seen a young man lately. His uncle, Kizhakkethil Raman Menon receives him cordially who reminisces his (Menon's) valiant efforts at a time when his elders would frown upon education, to send his sister, Aravindan's mother, to her studies in the city. However we come to know that city culture has destroyed her soft sides and that she now lives an unorganized life of an addict to intoxicants. Meanwhile, Appu, the boy-child of the priest, easily makes friends with his new wife Savithri. Strong child-mother affection develops between Appu and his stepmother Savithri. On some day, at a ritual performance, Aravindan and Savithri encounters each other for the first time. Aravindan, basically of a wandering nature does nothing significant after his arrival to the village. He then meets Savithri and their relationship develops sooner as the two can easily associate with one another's sorry lives. Aravindan, who was not cared well by his mother and as somebody who earlier had many unfulfilled and failed relationships with other women was looking for somebody who could actually understand and resonate his feelings. He then realizes Savithri to be exactly the kind of person he should have met. Gradually their romantic dreams develop without anyone suspecting them. The priest who is now completely engrossed in his temple rituals does not suspect her in any way until one day when he catches her with him in an amorous act. As a cheated husband he thinks it is his dharma (now that the girl Savithri sinned), as taught by his guru to send her back to her home. He sends her back. Savithri's father who was also the priest's understands her dilemma and is supportive of her and unhappy about the way his disciple whom he brought up in that very home, abandoned her. Meanwhile, Amminiyamma decides to reconcile the two and arrives at Savithri's house to request her father to ask the priest to receive Savithri back. The father makes his unhappiness clear and asserts how important his children are to him. However Savithri herself returns promising she will not make the mistake again. However the priest holds his ego higher and keeps distance from her. Thoughts of Aravindan's care and love start tormenting her one way or other. During the temple festival when every member of the family is off to the temple she decides to stay in the house, not wanting the people to gossip about her and the family. Holding the music box gifted by Aravindan, memories of the sweet days visit her. Unexpectedly Aravindan arrives there and the two embrace each other on the background of the sound and play of the temple fireworks. The two stare at the fireworks happy but confused and anxious about their future.
The next day she leaves a note to Appu encouraging him to forge his own path than abide by external forces, along with the music box which he had wanted. It is unclear what was the step she and Aravindan took. A distraught Appu throws away the music box in the river and leaves..

Cast
 Mohan Sharma as Aravindan
 Kottarakkara Sreedharan Nair as Brahmin priest
 Master Raghu as Appu
 Veeran
 M. S. Namboothiri
 Lakshmi as Savithri
 Kaviyoor Ponnamma as Amminiyamma
 Nanditha Bose as Aravindan's mother

Soundtrack
The music was composed by M. B. Sreenivasan with lyrics by Vayalar Ramavarma and Bichu Thirumala.

Awards
 Kerala State Film Awards
 Best Child Artist - Master Raghu
 Best Cinematography (Black-and-white) - Balu Mahendra
 Best Art Direction - Bharathan

References

External links
 

1975 films
1970s Malayalam-language films
Films directed by Bharathan
Films with screenplays by Padmarajan
Indian black-and-white films
Films about adultery in India
Malayalam films remade in other languages
1975 directorial debut films